Ričardas Berankis was the defending champion but chose not to defend his title.

Matthias Bachinger won the title after defeating Yang Tsung-hua 6–3, 6–4 in the final.

Seeds

Draw

Finals

Top half

Bottom half

References
Main Draw
Qualifying Draw

Gwangju Open - Singles
Gwangju Open